Artur Kozłowski may refer to:

 Artur Kozłowski (speleologist) (1977–2011), Polish cave diver
 Artur Kozłowski (athlete) (born 1985), Polish long-distance runner